The Whistler is a novel written by American author John Grisham. It was released in hardcover, large print paperback, e-book, compact disc audiobook and downloadable audiobook on October 25, 2016. It is a legal thriller about Florida Board on Judicial Conduct investigator Lacy Stoltz.

The plot centers on the legal and moral problems involved in Native American gaming. The (fictional) Tappacola Nation, a small Native American tribe located in the northern part of Florida, starts a casino in their reservation, giving the tribe members an unprecedented economic affluence and a measure of compensation for their sufferings during the centuries of European settlement, but also opening wide the potential for corruption and involvement with organized crime, up to and including outright murder.

Plot 
A mysterious source contacts the (fictional) Florida Board on Judicial Conduct, or BJC, promising information that will reveal the identity and crimes of the most corrupt judge in U.S. history. Investigator Lacy Stoltz is assigned to the case, and takes her sometime-partner Hugo Hatch with her to St. Augustine to meet the source in person. The source is revealed to be a disgraced lawyer from Pensacola named Ramsey Mix.

Mix reveals that the corrupt judge is Claudia McDover of Florida's 24th Circuit. Over the course of almost two decades, McDover has aided the local Coast Mafia in their scheme to build a casino in partnership with the Tappacola Indian Nation. Aside from skimming money from the casino, the Coast Mafia has also been responsible for many nearby real estate developments, with any legal problems smoothed over by McDover in exchange for cash payments and condominiums. In addition, the Coast Mafia has staged the murder of Son Razko, a prominent anti-casino member of the Tappacola Nation, and McDover has falsely convicted his right-hand man, Junior Mace, of the crime. Mix has been given this information by an intermediary representing an unknown "mole" close to McDover.

When Stoltz and Hatch begin an investigation, the leader of the Coast Mafia, Vonn Dubose, decides to retaliate. Stoltz and Hatch are lured to a remote part of the Tappacola reservation by a tribal member claiming to be a source. Driving away from the uneventful meeting, the duo are deliberately struck head-on by a truck. Hatch is killed and Stoltz is badly injured. This escalation convinces the director of the BJC, Michael Geismar, to ask for help from the FBI. However, the up-and-coming mob lieutenant tasked with killing Hatch and Stoltz left behind evidence at the crime scene and was caught on video at a nearby convenience store. Aided by this evidence and a former Tappacola Nation constable, BJC and FBI investigators find Hatch's killers and offer them reduced sentences in exchange for information against those higher up in the Coast Mafia.

As their operation begins to unravel, Dubose and McDover realize there is a leak. Suspicion lands on McDover's court recorder, JoHelen Hooper, who is in fact Mix's source. Realizing her danger, Hooper hides in a cheap hotel on Panama City Beach, but she is tracked there by a Coast Mafia hitman. With Stoltz's help, she manages to evade the hitman. Both women retreat to a lakeside cabin in North Carolina for safety while the FBI captures Dubose and McDover.

TV adaptation
On January 19, 2021, Entertainment One was set to produce the one-hour TV series for TNT.

See also

 Native American gaming

References

External links
Website at JGrisham.com
Official website at Random House

Novels by John Grisham
American thriller novels
2016 American novels
Legal thriller novels
Doubleday (publisher) books
Novels set in Florida
Hodder & Stoughton books